West Atco is an unincorporated community located within Winslow Township in Camden County, New Jersey, United States. One of Winslow Township's many parks is West Atco Park, a  public park located in the community that includes a playground, baseball field and basketball court.

See also
Atco, New Jersey

References

Winslow Township, New Jersey
Unincorporated communities in Camden County, New Jersey
Unincorporated communities in New Jersey